The Exposition Internationale of Colonial, Maritime, and Art was a world's fair held in Antwerp in 1930 in conjunction with another Belgian exhibition at the same time Exposition of 1930 in Liège to mark 100 years of Belgium's independence.

It was opened on 26 April 1930 by King Albert and Queen Elizabeth and closed on 5 November. There were 468,323 visitors.

International participants
Austria,    
Belgium,
Brazil,
Canada,
Congo,
Denmark,
Finland,
France,
Gold Coast,
Great Britain,
Holland,
Hungary,
Italy,
Japan,
la Lettonie,
Grand Duchy of Luxembourg,
Malaya,
Nigeria,
Norway,
Pays-Bas,
Persia,
Poland,
Portugal,
Spain,
Sweden,
Venezuela and
Yugoslavia.

Notes

References

1930 in Belgium
World's fairs in Antwerp
Colonial exhibitions